Live in London is a jazz album recorded in 1996 by jazz pianist Gene Harris.

Track listing
"There Is No Greater Love" (Symes, Jones) - 13:26
"Blue Monk" (Monk) - 11:18
"My Funny Valentine" (Rodgers, Hart) - 6:08
"In a Mellow Tone" (Ellington) - 15:18
"Misty" (Erroll Garner) 9:07
"Blues Closer" (Gene Harris) 7:22

Personnel

Gene Harris - Piano
Jim Mullen - Guitar
Andrew Cleyndert - Bass
Martin Drew - Drums
Pierre Paul - Engineer
Andrew Cleyndert - Engineer
George Klabin - Executive Producer
Pierre Paul - Mastered By

External links
Review by AllAboutJazz.com
Review by Audiophile Audition
Audio Samples

Gene Harris albums
2008 live albums